Karlovac Synagogue was a synagogue in Karlovac, Croatia.

Jewish community Karlovac was founded in 1852. Karlovac Synagogue was built under Filip Rajner, president of the Jewish community Karlovac, who liked to call himself "Croatian nationalist of Moses religion". Synagogue was built in 1870 in Renaissance Revival and Gothic architecture with five rosette at the front facade as a symbol of the Pentateuch. The facade of the synagogue has been directed toward the east, toward Eretz Yisrael. Synagogue had organ inside. It was consecrated in 1871. During World War II synagogue was turned into a warehouse. After the war, around 1960, Karlovac Synagogue was demolished by the regime of SFR Yugoslavia.

References

Ashkenazi Jewish culture in Croatia
Ashkenazi synagogues
Synagogues completed in 1870
Former synagogues in Croatia
Destroyed synagogues in Croatia
Karlovac
Buildings and structures demolished in 1960
Renaissance Revival synagogues
Gothic Revival synagogues